"I Saw It Cummin'" is the first single released from PMD's debut album, Shade Business. It was produced by PMD and DJ Scratch and became PMD's most successful single during his brief solo career, peaking at 89 on the Billboard Hot 100, his only solo single to do so.

The song sampled the Ohio Players' "Funky Worm", Ice Cube's "No Vaseline" and Snoop Doggy Dogg's "What's My Name" and was a diss song aimed at his former musical partner Erick Sermon. The duo disbanded EPMD the previous year due to tensions stemming from a late 1991 burglary of PMD's home in which Sermon was allegedly involved.

Single track listing

A-Side
"I Saw It Cummin'" (Album Version)- 4:00  
"I Saw It Cummin'" (Zone Mix)- 3:57  
"I Saw It Cummin'" (Back Alley Bozack Mix)- 3:45  
"I Saw It Cummin'" (Underground Funk Mix)- 3:57

B-Side
"Steppin' Thru Hardcore" (Album Version)- 3:37  
"I Saw It Cummin'" (Instrumental)- 4:00

Charts

References 

1994 debut singles
PMD (rapper) songs
1994 songs
RCA Records singles
Songs written by PMD (rapper)